Bennett Jones Sims (August 9, 1920 – July 17, 2006) was the sixth bishop of the Episcopal Diocese of Atlanta, consecrated in 1972. Upon retirement from the Diocese in 1983, Sims founded the Institute for Servant Leadership at Emory University and served as president of the institute until 1999.

Background
Son of Lewis Raymond and Sarah Cosette Sims, Bennett J. Sims was born in Greenfield, Massachusetts. In 1943, he earned a BA from Baker University.  On September 25 of that year, he married Beatrice Wimberly.

During World War II, Sims served in the United States Navy as a line officer on destroyers. He then attended Virginia Theological Seminary, earning his Master of Divinity in 1948. In June of that year, he was ordained as deacon and in April 1950 he was ordained a priest. Both times he was ordained by Noble C. Powell, Bishop of Maryland. Sims became Curate at Church of the Redeemer, Baltimore, Maryland, in 1949 and two years later was named its rector, serving until 1962. That year he served as priest-in-charge at St. Alban's Church in Tokyo, Japan.

From 1963 to 1964, he served as Rector of Christ Church in Corning, New York, participating in the 1963 March on Washington for Jobs and Freedom, where Martin Luther King Jr. gave his famous "I Have a Dream" speech. From 1964 to 1965 he was a Harvard fellow. In 1968, he signed the “Writers and Editors War Tax Protest” pledge, vowing to refuse tax payments in protest against the Vietnam War. He returned to VTS, receiving a Doctorate in Divinity in 1966. From 1966 to 1972 he was director of the Continuing Education Department at Virginia Seminary, also serving, in 1969, as priest-in-charge at St. Alban's Church in Tokyo, Japan, and studied systematic theology at The Catholic University of America, Washington, D.C. (1969-1971).

In 1972, Sims was elected bishop of the Diocese of Atlanta. During his episcopacy, he was in strong opposition to the rising divorce rate, and spoke about his preference for the integrity of marriage vows. Among the issues receiving his support and leadership were racial integration of the public schools, revision of the Episcopal prayer book, the ordination of women, and, ultimately, the acceptance of homosexuals in the church.

Upon retirement from the Diocese of Atlanta, he stayed in Atlanta, where he founded the Institute for Servant Leadership at Emory University in 1983. From 1980 to 1988, Sims held a visiting professorship at Candler School of Theology at Emory University. Sims married a second time on August 27, 1988, to Mary Page Welborn, and together they moved the Institute for Servant Leadership to Hendersonville, North Carolina. He continued to serve as president of the institute until his retirement in 1999. Sims died at the age of 85 at his home on July 17, 2006.

Sims is the author of five books: Invitation to Hope: A Testimony of Encouragement (1974); Purple Ink: A Selection of the Writings of Bennett J. Sims as Bishop of Atlanta (1982); Servanthood: Leadership for the Third Millennium (1997); Why Bush Must Go: A Bishop’s Faith-Based Challenge (2004); and The Time of My Life: A Spiritual Pilgrimage Grounded in Hope (2006).

Consecrators
 John E. Hines, 22nd Presiding Bishop of the Episcopal Church in the United States
 Randolph Royall Claiborne, Jr., 5th Bishop of Atlanta
 William Davidson, 6th Bishop of Western Kansas
Bennett Sims was the 676th bishop consecrated in the Episcopal Church.

See also
 Episcopal Diocese of Atlanta
 List of Bishop Succession in the Episcopal Church

Notes

References
  Atlanta Diocese Centennial History page on Sims.
 The Episcopal Church Annual. Morehouse Publishing: New York, NY (2005).

1920 births
2006 deaths
American tax resisters
Baker University alumni
Harvard Fellows
Episcopal bishops of Atlanta
Catholic University of America alumni
People from Greenfield, Massachusetts
20th-century American Episcopalians